Mark Lee (born August 2, 1999), professionally known as Mark, is a Canadian rapper, singer, dancer and songwriter based in South Korea. He is a member of the South Korean boy band NCT and its fixed sub-units NCT 127 and NCT Dream, as well as the South Korean supergroup SuperM.

Career

2012–2016: Pre-debut
In 2012, Mark joined SM Entertainment as a trainee after passing the SM Global Audition in Vancouver, Canada. 
On December 16, 2013, he was introduced as a member of SM Rookies, a pre-debut team of trainees under SM Entertainment. As a part of the SM Rookies program, in October 2014, he and several his co-members appeared on the Mnet-produced Exo 90:2014, a show starring labelmates Exo, where they perform dances to K-pop songs from the 1990s. 

In 2015, Mark and other SM Rookies members starred as Mouseketeers in a Korean revival of The Mickey Mouse Club, which aired on Disney Channel Korea. The show included musical performances, games, and skits, similar to the original American show. It aired from July 23 to December 17, 2015, hosted by Leeteuk of Super Junior.

2016–2018: NCT and solo endeavors
In April 2016, SM Entertainment confirmed that Mark and four other members of SM Rookies—Taeyong, Doyoung, Ten and Jaehyun—would debut as members of NCT's first sub-unit, NCT U. They released their first digital single on April 9, titled "The 7th Sense", in which he and Taeyong participated in songwriting. Three months later, SM Entertainment announced that Mark would become a member of NCT's second sub-unit, NCT 127, along with Taeyong, Taeil, Yuta, Jaehyun, Winwin and Haechan. NCT 127 made their official debut with the extended play NCT #127 and title track "Fire Truck" on July 10, 2016.

Mark joined NCT's third sub-unit, NCT Dream, which consisted of members Renjun, Jeno, Haechan, Jaemin, Chenle and Jisung. The group officially debuted on August 24, 2016, with the single "Chewing Gum". The following month, Mark featured on Henry Lau's "Going Through Your Heart", an original soundtrack for the KBS drama, Sweet Stranger and Me. This marked his first solo endeavour since his debut in NCT.

In January 2017, Mark joined High School Rapper, a survival hip hop reality TV show that aired on Mnet. He advanced to the finals and performed an original song, "Drop" featuring labelmate Seulgi of Red Velvet, and placed seventh overall. In July 2017, Mark collaborated with Exo's Xiumin on single "Young & Free". It was released through Season 2 of SM Entertainment's digital music project SM Station. The same month, Mark appeared in the first season of the music variety show Snowball Project. He teamed up with Park Jae-jung to release "Lemonade Love" on July 21, also through SM Station, which was produced by former labelmate Henry Lau and Yoon Jong-shin.

Beginning in February 2018, Mark served as one of the main hosts of the music program Show! Music Core, leaving in January 2019 to focus on activities with NCT 127. In May 2018, he became a regular cast member on the MBC reality TV show It's Dangerous Beyond The Blankets. In October 2018, Mark released the song "Dream Me" with Red Velvet's Joy for the soundtrack of the KBS drama The Ghost Detective. Mark was the first member to officially graduate from NCT Dream on December 31, 2018.

2019–present: SuperM and rejoining NCT Dream
On August 7, 2019, Mark was confirmed as a member of SuperM, a supergroup created by SM Entertainment in collaboration with Capitol Records. The group began promoting in October of that year in the American music market. SuperM's self-titled debut EP was released on October 4, 2019, led by the single "Jopping". Mark continued to promote with SuperM throughout 2020, through the release the group's first studio album, Super One. On April 14, SM Entertainment announced through an official statement that Mark would be rejoining NCT Dream, thus abolishing their original age-based graduation system. His return was affirmed through his participation in the NCT Dream song "Déjà Vu" on the group-wide studio album NCT 2020 Resonance.

On January 28, 2022, it was announced that Mark would release his first single, "Child", on February 4, as part of NCT Lab. "Child", described as an emotional hip-hop track, was commended for its lyrics.

Other ventures

Ambassadorship 
In 2022, Polo Ralph Lauren selected Mark as the Korean ambassador of the brand.

Philanthropy 
In February 2023, Mark donated  million to the Hope Bridge National Disaster Relief Association to help victims of the 2023 Turkey–Syria earthquake and  million to the Community Chest of Korea along with Genie Music.

Discography

As lead artist

Collaborations

Sountrack appearances

Filmography

Television shows

Music videos

Songwriting credits 
All credits are adapted from the Korea Music Copyright Association, unless cited otherwise.

Awards and nominations

Notes

References

External links
 
 Mark Lee at SM Town

1999 births
Living people
21st-century Canadian male singers
21st-century Canadian rappers
21st-century South Korean singers
Canadian expatriates in South Korea
Canadian male dancers
Canadian male rappers
Canadian male singers
Canadian musicians of Korean descent
Canadian people of South Korean descent
Canadian pop singers
Canadian television personalities
K-pop singers
Korean-language singers of Canada
NCT (band) members
Rappers from Toronto
School of Performing Arts Seoul alumni
SM Entertainment artists
SM Rookies members
South Korean male idols
South Korean male rappers
South Korean male singers
South Korean pop singers
South Korean television personalities
SuperM members